Scugog is a township in the Regional Municipality of Durham, south-central Ontario, Canada. It is northeast of Toronto and just north of Oshawa.  The anchor and largest population base of the township is Port Perry. The township has a population of roughly 22,500. A smaller Scugog Township was also a historic municipality and geographic township prior to the amalgamation that formed the current municipality.

History
The original township of Scugog used to be divided between Reach and Cartwright townships in Ontario County and Northumberland and Durham County, respectively.  When Lake Scugog was created by a dam in Lindsay in 1834, flooding created an island known as Scugog Island.  The island was separated from Reach and Cartwright to form Scugog Township in 1856.  In 1872 George Currie built a grain elevator which is currently Canada's oldest grain elevator. The new township was part of Ontario County.

According to Alan Rayburn's Place Names of Ontario, the name Scugog is derived from the Mississauga word sigaog, which means "waves leap over a canoe."  This refers to the creation of Lake Scugog.  Other sources indicate that it is an Ojibwe word meaning swampy or marshy land. The existence of two other lakes by the same name (neither of which is artificial) lends support to the latter etymology.

The creation of the Regional Municipality of Durham in 1974 resulted in municipal restructuring of the various townships in Ontario County. The current township of Scugog was created through the amalgamation of the original townships of Scugog, Reach and Cartwright and the town of Port Perry.

Local government 

The Township of Scugog is governed by a mayor, a regional councillor and five councillors elected on the basis of one per ward. Ward 1 includes Greenbank, Seagrave, Epsom, Utica and Manchester. Ward 2 is Port Perry (South of 7A) and Prince Albert. Ward 3 is Scugog Island. Ward 4 is Blackstock, Nestleton Station, Nestleton and Caesarea. Ward 5 is Port Perry (north of 7A). The council holds regular meetings, open to the public at the town hall in Port Perry.

The regional councillor joins the mayor to attend meetings at the Durham Regional Council. The members of council elected in 2018 are:

Mayor: Bobbie Drew

Regional Councillor: Wilma Wotten

Councillors:

 Ward 1 : Ian McDougall
 Ward 2: Janna Guido
 Ward 3: Robert Rock
 Ward 4: Deborah Kiezebrink
 Ward 5: Lance Brown

Current municipality

Port Perry is the chief commercial and administrative centre of the municipality. The township also includes the communities of:

Aldreds Beach – east side of Scugog Island at the eastern end of Demara Road
Blackstock – east of Port Perry on Old Scugog Road between Church Street and Highway 7A
Cadmus – east of Blackstock on Edgerton Road at Cartwright East
Caesarea – opposite of Aldreds Beach on Lake Scugog on Scugog Road
Carnegie Beach – northeast end of Scugog Island on Carnegie Beach Road
Cedar Shores – opposite Honey Beach on Lake Scugog on Island Road at Pine Point Road
Epsom – west of Port Perry and north of Utica on Reach Street at Marsh Hill Road
Fralicks Beach – northwest side of Scugog Island on Mississauga Trail north of Hood Drive
Gerrows Beach – opposite of Highland Beach on Scugog Island
Greenbank – northwest of Port Perry
Highland Beach – located just north of Port Perry
Honey Beach – east side of Scugog Island at end of Whitfield Road
Lakeside Beach- opposite of Honey Beach on Lake Scugog
Manchester – southwest of Port Perry on Highway 12
Marsh Hill – northwest of Greenbank
McLaren's Beach – north of Pine Point
Nestleton – north of Nestleton on McLaughlin Road
Nestleton Station – northeast of Blackstock on Highway 7A near Nestleton Road
Pine Point – south of Aldreds Beach on Point Point Road east of Mississauga Trail
Port View Beach – opposite of Port Perry on Scugog Island
Prince Albert – located southwest of Port Perry at King Street and Simcoe Road
Prospect – southwest of Port Perry on Highway 7 and Scugog Line 2
Purple Hill on Shirley Road and west of Cartwright West Quarter Line
Saintfield – north of Greenbank on Highway 7/12 at Saintfield Road
Saint Christopher – due east of Scugog Point
Scugog – at Island Road and Chandler Road just north of Scugog Centre
Scugog Centre – east of Lakeside Beach at Island Road and Demara Road 
Scugog Point – north of Nestleton Station on east shore of Lake Scugog
Seagrave – north of Port Perry on Simcoe Street
Shirley – southeast of Port Perry on Shirley Road at Sandy Road
Strattonville – west of Epsom and due east of Uxbridge
Sunrise Beach- east side of Scugog Island at east end of Chandler Drive
Sunset View – opposite of Honey Beach on Lake Scugog
Utica – west of Port Perry and south of Epsom on Regional Road 21 and Marsh Hill Road
Victoria Corners – northwest of Greenbank and near Leaskdale on Victoria Corners Road and Lake Ridge Road
Williams Point – southwest of Scugog Point along east shore of Lake Scugog near Nestleton Road and Scugog Road

Mississaugas of Scugog First Nations

Reserves # 34 consists of two tracts, east of Mississauga's Trail between Hood Drive and Pogue Road as well
as west of Mississauga's Trail from Pogue Road to Seven Mile Island Road/Chandler Drive.

Great Blue Heron Casino is located on the reserve. A Health and Resource Centre and Reserves Administration Office are located on Island Road.

Schools

Public Schools:
R.H. Cornish P.S
S.A. Cawker P.S
Prince Albert P.S
Cartwright P.S
Greenbank P.S

High Schools:
Port Perry High School

Catholic Schools:
Good Shepheard Catholic School

Economy

The largest private-sector employer in the area is the Great Blue Heron Casino, located on the Scugog First Nation on Scugog Island.  Schneider Meats also has a facility in the Township.  The Township is also a popular tourist destination due to the casino and recreational opportunities from Lake Scugog.  Many residents also commute to other Durham Region communities and further afield by road.

Attractions

 Nonquon Provincial Wildlife Area – 1,120-hectare (2,800 acre) protected area located northwest of Port Perry and managed by Ontario Ministry of Natural Resources
 Ocala Orchards Farm Winery – 100 acre winery established in 1995 by Irwin and Alissa Smith south of Utica
 Scugog Shores Museum
 Oakridges Moraine Trail – located at south end of Scugog
Historic Downtown Port Perry 
Lake Scugog waterfront

Transportation

Roads and highways
Main roads in Scugog are:

 Simcoe Street (Durham Regional Road 2) – connect communities north and south from Port Perry
 Highway 7/Highway 12 – connects communities south and north of Greenbank, as well as to Oshawa
 Highway 7A – connects communities east and west of Port Perry
 Island Road (Durham Regional Road 7) – north and south areas on the west side of Scugog Island

Airports
There are two airports in Scugog, both are public airfields used by small propeller aircraft:

 Greenbank Airport
 Port Perry/Hoskin Aerodrome

Lakeridge Health Port Perry site has a helipad for air ambulance use only.

Demographics 

In film
 The 1973 TV movie, The Thanksgiving Treasure, starring Jason Robards, was partially filmed at the general store in Seagrave, and at a farm on Old Simcoe Road just to the west of Seagrave.
 The 1978 TV movie, Home to Stay, starring Henry Fonda, was shot on a farm on 12 Scugog Line and at Seagrave.
 Parts of the 1996 film Fly Away Home were filmed in Scugog.
 The downtown scenes from 2004's Welcome to Mooseport were shot in Port Perry.
 The downtown scenes from Hemlock Grove were shot in Port Perry.
 In Season 3 "Lakeside" of American Gods (TV series) some parts were shot in downtown Port Perry. They painted the mill black and made other little changes around the town

See also
List of townships in Ontario

References

External links
 

Township municipalities in Ontario
Lower-tier municipalities in Ontario
Municipalities in the Regional Municipality of Durham